Midnight is a time of day.

Midnight may also refer to:

Books
 Midnight (Koontz novel), a 1989 novel by Dean Koontz
 Midnight (Hunter novel), a 2005 novel by Erin Hunter
 Midnight (Wilson novel), a 2003 children's novel by Jacqueline Wilson
Midnight: A Romance of China, 1930, a 1933 novel by Mao Dun
 Midnight: A Gangster Love Story, a 2008 novel by Sister Souljah
 Midnight (comics), a set-index of several uses, including:
 Midnight (DC Comics), a comic book character
 Midnight (Jeff Wilde), a Marvel Comics character in the Moon Knight series
 Midnight Sun (Marvel Comics) or Midnight, a Marvel Comics character
 Midnight, a previous name of the Globe tabloid newspaper
 Midnight Songs poetry (Ziye Ge), a poetry type
 Wangan Midnight, a 1991 Japanese manga series

Film and television
 Midnight (1918 film), a German silent crime film
 Midnight (1922 film), a lost American silent drama
 Midnight (1931 film), a film starring Eve Gray
 Midnight (1934 film), a film noir directed by Chester Erskine, with Humphrey Bogart in an early role
 Midnight (1939 film), a romantic comedy starring Claudette Colbert, Don Ameche and John Barrymore
 Midnight (1949 film), a Mexican crime film
 Midnight (1982 film), a film by John Russo
 Midnight (1989 film), a film by Norman Thaddeus Vane
 Midnight (1998 film), a Brazilian film by Walter Salles
 Midnight (2021 film), a South Korean film
 "Midnight" (Doctor Who), an episode of Doctor Who
 "Midnight" (Fringe), an episode of Fringe
 @midnight, a comedy game show

Games
 Midnight (role-playing game), a campaign setting for Dungeons & Dragons
 Midnight (game), a game played with six dice
 Midnight or Boxcars (slang), the outcome of rolling two sixes with a pair of dice
 Midnight, the setting for video game The Lords of Midnight

Music

Musicians
 Midnight (musician) (1962–2009), former member of Crimson Glory
 The Midnight, an American synthwave band
 The Midnights, a New Zealand reggae band
 Midnight Boy (born 1988), Swedish singer and songwriter
 Charlie Midnight, American songwriter and record producer

Albums and EPs
 Midnight (Diane Schuur album), 2003
 Midnight (Set It Off album), 2019
 Midnight, a 2015 album by Grace Potter
 Midnight, a 2017 album by Lewis Watson
 Midnight ('68 EP), a 2013 EP by '68
 Midnight (Loona EP), a Korean language EP by Loona
 The Midnight (EP), a 2000 EP by Lemon Jelly
 Midnights, a 2022 album by Taylor Swift

Songs
 "Midnight" (Beast song), 2012
 "Midnight" (Coldplay song), 2014, from Ghost Stories
 "Midnight" (Elán song), from Street Child
 "Midnight" (Jessie Ware song), 2017
 "Midnight" (Logic song)
 "Midnight" (Red Foley song), 1952
 "Midnight" (Tor Miller song), 2015, from Headlights EP
 "Midnight / Choice", a 1991 single by Orbital
 "Midnight", by The Birthday Massacre from Pins and Needles
 "Midnight", by Chancellor from Chancellor
 "Midnight", by Ice-T from O.G. Original Gangster
 "Midnight", by Joe Satriani from Surfing with the Alien
 "Midnight", by The Monkees from Pool It!
 "Midnight", by Red Hot Chili Peppers from By the Way
 "Midnight", by Caravan Palace from <|°_°|>
 "Midnight", by Jason J. which represented Guam in the American Song Contest

Ships
 SS Midnight, two vessels
 USS Midnight, two U.S. Navy vessels

Sports
 Midnight league, a series of initiatives for urban youth sport
 Midnight basketball, midnight leagues in basketball
 Midnight (horse), a bucking rodeo horse
 Midnight (wrestler) (born 1965), Ann Marie Crooks, Jamaican bodybuilder and professional wrestler

Other uses
 Midnight blue, a dark shade of blue
 Johnny Midnight (broadcaster) (1941–2014), Filipino radio and television broadcaster
 Midnight, Mississippi, U.S., an unincorporated community
 'Midnight', a hybrid cultivar of Poa pratensis (Kentucky bluegrass)

See also
 12 o'clock (disambiguation)
 After Midnight (disambiguation)
 Midnight Cowboy (disambiguation)
 Midnight Hour (disambiguation)
 The Midnight Man (disambiguation)
 Midnight Special (disambiguation)
 Midnight Sun (disambiguation)
 Midnight Song (disambiguation)
 Midnite (disambiguation)
 Round Midnight (disambiguation)